Belfast City Council is the local authority with responsibility for part of the city of Belfast, the capital and largest city of Northern Ireland. Belfast City Council is the primary council of the Belfast Metropolitan Area, a grouping of six former district councils with commuter towns and overspill from Belfast, containing a total population of 579,276.

The council is made up of 60 councillors, elected from ten district electoral areas. It holds its meetings in the historic Belfast City Hall. The current Lord Mayor is Tina Black of Sinn Féin.

As part of the 2014/2015 reform of local government in Northern Ireland the city council area expanded, and now covers an area that includes 53,000 additional residents in 21,000 households. The number of councillors increased from 51 to 60. The first elections to the expanded city council took place on 22 May 2014.

History

Belfast's modern history can be dated back to the Plantation of Ulster in the early 17th century which brought significant numbers of Protestant Scottish and English settlers to Ulster. The town gradually developed to become a major industrial centre, in particular in the areas of linen and ship building. In recognition of this growth Belfast was granted city status in 1888 and by 1901, it was the largest city in Ireland. The city's importance was evidenced by the construction of the lavish City Hall, completed in 1906.

The body now known as Belfast City Council has its origins in the defunct Belfast Corporation, and was created in its current form following the local council elections of May 1973. Originally it was intended that there would be 52 wards. However, local enquiries meant that the proposed Tullycarnet ward became instead the Castlereagh Borough Council wards of Tullycarnet and Gilnahirk, leaving Belfast with 51. Although the county borough of Belfast was created when it was granted city status by Queen Victoria in 1888, the city continues to be viewed as straddling County Antrim and County Down with the River Lagan generally being seen as the line of demarcation.

From the late 18th century onwards, the city's Roman Catholic population gradually increased, although the city was still dominated by its mostly Ulster Protestant majority. The council was dominated by unionists from its inception until 1997, when they lost overall control for the first time in its history, with the Alliance Party of Northern Ireland gaining the balance of power between Irish nationalists and unionists. This position was confirmed in the three subsequent council elections, with mayors from the Irish nationalist Sinn Féin and Social Democratic and Labour Party (SDLP), and the cross-community Alliance Party regularly elected since 1997. The election in 2011 saw Irish nationalist councillors outnumber unionist councillors for the first time, 24–21, with Sinn Féin becoming the largest party, and the Alliance Party maintaining the balance of power with six members. The 2011 census findings confirmed this significant change in demographics. In the Belfast City Council area, the proportion of people who were Catholic or brought up Catholic (48.58%) is larger than those who were Protestant or brought up Protestant (42.30%) for the first time. In terms of national identity 43.16% of the population considered themselves to be British, 34.77% considered themselves to be Irish, and 26.82% considered themselves to be of Northern Irish nationality.

Coat of arms and motto

The city of Belfast has the Latin motto "." This is taken from Psalm 116 Verse 12 in the Latin Vulgate Bible and is literally "For (Pro) so much (tanto) what (quid) we shall repay (retribuamus)" The verse has been translated in bibles differently – for example as "What shall I render unto the Lord for all his benefits toward me?". It is also translated as "In return for so much, what shall we give back?" The Queen's University Students' Union Rag Week publication PTQ derives its name from the first three words of the motto.

The coat of arms of the city (pictured, above right) are blazoned as Party per fesse argent and azure, in chief a pile vair and on a canton gules a bell argent, in base a ship with sails set argent on waves of the sea proper. This heraldic language describes a shield that is divided in two horizontally (party per fesse). The top (chief) of the shield is silver (argent), and has a point-down triangle (a pile) with a repeating blue-and-white pattern that represents fur (vair). There is also a red square in the top corner (a canton gules) on which there is a silver bell. It is likely that the bell is an example here of "canting" (or punning) heraldry, representing the first syllable of Belfast. In the lower part of the shield (in base) there is a silver sailing ship shown sailing on waves coloured in the actual colours of the sea (proper). The supporter on the "dexter" side (that is, the viewer's left) is a chained wolf, while on the "sinister" side the supporter is a sea-horse. The crest above the shield is also a sea-horse. These arms date back to 1613, when King James I granted Belfast town status. The seal was used by Belfast merchants throughout the 17th century on their signs and trade-coins. A large stained glass window in the City Hall displays the arms, where an explanation suggests that the seahorse and the ship refer to Belfast's significant maritime history. The wolf may be a tribute to the city's founder, Sir Arthur Chichester, and refer to his own coat of arms.

Councillors
The latest election to Belfast City Council took place on 2 May 2019, with the city's voters electing sixty councillors.

Party strengths

Historical composition
Parties' election performances have changed substantially since the council election in 1973. The Ulster Unionist Party made a strong initial showing and remained the largest unionist party until 2005, when the Democratic Unionist Party became the dominant unionist party, while Sinn Féin has become the largest party overall. Nationalist representation showed a steady increase until recently, however still managed to become the largest grouping in the 2011 election.  The number of unionist councillors has fallen almost every election. Cross-community representation has increased somewhat rapidly over the last few elections, almost overtaking the unionist representation in the 2019 election.

Councillors by electoral area
The council area is subdivided into 60 electoral wards, nominally one for each elected councillor. However, as the PR-STV voting system requires multi-seat constituencies, the 60 wards are grouped into ten district electoral areas (DEA) which elect between five and seven councillors each:
 Balmoral (5)
 Black Mountain (7)
 Botanic (5)
 Castle (6)
 Collin (6)
 Court (6)
 Lisnasharragh (6)
 Oldpark (6)
 Ormiston (7)
 Titanic (6)
The current members are:

† Co-opted to fill a vacancy since the election.‡ New party affiliation since the election.Last updated 6 January 2023.

For further details see 2019 Belfast City Council election.

Offices

Lord Mayor and Deputy Lord Mayor

The Lord Mayor of Belfast is the leader and chairman of Belfast City Council and is elected annually by the council to serve a one-year term. A Deputy Lord Mayor is normally elected at the same Council meeting as the Lord Mayor.

The Lord's Mayor's role is largely ceremonial, but does include the following powers and duties:
 In times of natural disaster the Lord Mayor may direct resources such as Police, Fire and Ambulance as they see fit
 Presiding over meetings of the council and, in the case of equality of votes, the Lord Mayor has a second or casting vote
 Promoting and raising awareness of the council's main objectives and priority issues
 Encouraging and supporting all aspects of life in Belfast by attending civic and public events
 Receiving distinguished visitors to the city
 Acting as host on behalf of the council and the citizens of Belfast at civic functions
 Acting as a spokesperson to the local, national and international media
 Providing an appropriate response on behalf of Belfast at times of local, national and international catastrophe
 Supporting and encouraging charitable and other appeals as appropriate
 Promoting Belfast's business, commercial, cultural and social life
 Promoting Belfast as a place of excellence in which to do business and as a tourist destination.

The position that is now the Lord Mayor originated in 1613 in the town's Royal Charter as the 'Sovereign of Belfast'. In 1842, this position was restyled the 'Mayor of Belfast'. When Belfast was granted city status in 1892, the position was given Lord Mayor status, making it one of only three cities on the island of Ireland having a Lord Mayor, the other two being Cork and Dublin. In 1929, it became one of only six cities in the United Kingdom to have a Lord Mayor styled "the Right Honourable". Until 1973 the position was held for three years, when it was reduced to its current term of one year. From its formation in 1921 until its abolition in 1972, the Lord Mayor was automatically entitled to a seat in the Senate of Northern Ireland.

For most of the city's modern history, the position has been held by unionists, with members of the Ulster Unionist Party holding the post for a total of 61 of the 67 years between 1921 and 1997. The first non-unionist Lord Mayor since the partition of Ireland in 1921 was David Cook from the Alliance Party, who was elected in 1978. The first Irish nationalist Lord Mayor was not appointed until the election of Alban Maginness from the SDLP in 1997, while a Sinn Féin Lord Mayor was first elected in 2002. The end of the unionist majority on the Council in 1997 has resulted in a greater rotation of the position amongst the parties, which, like other elected positions within the Council such as Committee chairs, is now filled using the D'Hondt system. This system awards positions to parties based on their number of councillors.

Aldermen
The Local Government (Modification of Borough Charters) Order (Northern Ireland) 1973 entitles the council to appoint up to twelve of its members to the honorary position of alderman. The role of alderman is appointed at the first annual meeting following the election of the council and does not carry any extra responsibilities other than the right to be referred to as an alderman rather than councillor. Following the local elections in 1997 and 2005 the Council voted not to appoint any of its members to the positions, however all twelve places were filled after the May 2011 election.

The present Alderman are:

High Sheriff

The High Sheriff of Belfast is a largely ceremonial position currently held by John Hussey who took office on 2 February 2022. The High Sheriff is theoretically the King's judicial representative in the city, while the Lord Lieutenant is the Sovereign's personal representative, however the office is now largely symbolic with few formal duties other than deputising for the Lord Mayor at official events. The position was created in 1900 under the Local Government (Ireland) Act 1898, with Sir James Henderson the first holder. Appointments are made on annual basis by the Secretary of State for Northern Ireland, who asks the outgoing High Sheriff and the council to suggest the names of three people who are deemed suitable to hold the position. In recent years the council has suggested only one candidate, who is normally a member of the council. The High Sheriff's term of office runs from January to December, which is distinct from the term of office for the Lord Mayor and Deputy Lord Mayor who take up office in May or June each year.

Lord Lieutenant

The Lord Lieutenant of Belfast is the official representative of the King for the 'County Borough of Belfast'. The Lord Lieutenant is Dame Finnouala Jay-O'Boyle, DBE who was appointed in July 2014.  The position was first created in 1900 and was held by the Marquess of Londonderry. The role is largely honorary with the few formal duties relating to liaising with the King's Private Office in the lead up to visits to the City regarding issues of local concern and the presentation of awards on behalf of the King.

2014/2015 reform
The district councils of Northern Ireland were reformed in 2015. The councillors elected on 5 May 2011 served on Belfast City Council until 31 March 2015. At the local elections on 22 May 2014 a new Belfast City Council was elected and acted as a shadow authority until coming into its powers on 1 April 2015. The local government district of Belfast was expanded on 1 April 2015 to the south to include areas formerly part of the Castlereagh, Lisburn and North Down districts. The new electoral areas are Balmoral, Black Mountain, Botanic, Castle, Collin, Court, Lisnasharragh, Oldpark, Ormiston and Titanic.

Parliamentary and Assembly constituencies
Belfast has four coterminous constituencies for the UK Parliament and the Northern Ireland Assembly, which extend somewhat beyond the city boundaries into parts of Castlereagh, Lisburn and Newtownabbey districts. At the 2019 UK general election, Belfast returned four MPs for the following constituencies: Belfast North (John Finucane, Sinn Féin), Belfast East (Gavin Robinson, DUP), Belfast South (Claire Hanna, SDLP) and Belfast West (Paul Maskey, Sinn Féin).

In the 2022 Northern Ireland Assembly election, Belfast returned a total of 20 MLAs (five per constituency) for the constituencies of Belfast North, Belfast East, Belfast South and Belfast West. Prior to the 2017 election, each constituency elected six MLAs or a total of 24 MLAs for Belfast.

The results for both elections are summarised below:

Committees

The council has six committees, the members of which are appointed at the annual meeting of the council.

Each of the committees consists of 20 councillors with the quorum (the minimum number of councillors that are required to be present to transact business legally) of each committee being five members.  Committees sit at least monthly with the exception of July.  All committees are constituted to reflect, as far as practicable, the different political groups into which the members of the council are divided.  The posts of chairman and deputy chairman of committees are allocated on the basis of the d'Hondt system of proportionality:
 Development Committee
 Health and Environmental Services Committee
 Licensing Committee
 Parks and Leisure Committee
 Strategic Policy and Resources Committee
 Town Planning Committee

Minutes
Minutes of meetings of Council committees and subcommittees are available at Belfast City Council (searchable) and at Belfast NI Gov Wiki (unofficial site).

Council departments
The council has seven departments.

Demography

The area covered by the current Belfast City Council has a population of 333,871 residents according to the 2011 Northern Ireland census. The area covered by the old Belfast City Council before the 2015 local government reorganisation in Northern Ireland had a population of 280,962 residents according to the same census.

In the 2011 census the distributions of population, religion, national identity and proportion of immigrants within the Belfast City Council area were as follows.

See also
 Lord Mayor of Belfast
 High Sheriff of Belfast
 Local government in Northern Ireland
 List of parks in Northern Ireland
 List of public art in Belfast

Notes

References

External links

 Belfast City Council
 Go To Belfast – Tourism
 Belfast City Council Minutes – unofficial wiki with annotated and cross-referenced minutes of meetings of Belfast City Council
 Belfast City Council, 1993 – 2005

 
District councils of Northern Ireland
District councils of Northern Ireland, 1973–2015